The Carolinas are the U.S. states of North Carolina and South Carolina, considered collectively. They are bordered by Virginia to the north, Tennessee to the west, and Georgia to the southwest. The Atlantic Ocean is to the east.

Combining North Carolina's population of 10,439,388 and South Carolina's of 5,118,425, the Carolinas have a collective population of 15,557,813 as of 2020. If the Carolinas were a single state of the United States, it would be the fifth-most populous state, behind California, Texas, Florida, and New York.

The Carolinas were known as the Province of Carolina during America's early colonial period, from 1663 to 1710. Prior to that, the land was considered part of the Colony and Dominion of Virginia, from 1609 to 1663. The province, named Carolina to honor King Charles I of England, was divided into two royal colonies in 1729, although the actual date is the subject of debate.

History

The region was claimed as part of the Spanish territory named La Florida by Ponce de Leon in 1513. Santa Elena, a Spanish settlement on what is now Parris Island, South Carolina, was the capital of La Florida from 1566 to 1587. It was founded by Pedro Menéndez de Avilés, the first governor of Spanish Florida. There had been a number of earlier attempts to establish colonies in the area by both the Spanish and the French, who had been inspired by earlier accounts of the plentiful land of Chicora. Menéndez's Santa Elena settlement shifted the focus of Spanish colonial efforts northward from St. Augustine, which had been established in 1565 to drive the French from their colony of Fort Caroline. Santa Elena was ultimately built at the site of the abandoned French outpost of Charlesfort, founded in 1562 by Jean Ribault.

The establishment of Santa Elena followed the destruction of the French Fort Caroline by Menéndez in 1565. The Spanish settlement housed a sizeable community, and became the base of operations for the Jesuits and military working in the northern zone of Spanish Florida. From this base the Spanish founded a number of other ephemeral forts as far inland as the Appalachian Mountains, but resistance from local Native American tribes and the lack of interest of Spain in the area, caused these to be abandoned, relocated or destroyed. Santa Elena was ultimately abandoned in 1587, with its survivors relocating to St. Augustine. The Spanish never pressed their colonial claims to the area again, focusing on other areas of the American continent. The territory was thereafter left to the native Americans until October 30, 1629, when Charles I granted a patent to his attorney-general, Sir Robert Heath, for the lands south of 36 degrees and north of 31 degrees, "under the name, in honor of that king, of Carolana"." Carolus is Latin for 'Charles'. The charter was unrealized and later ruled invalid.

On March 24, 1663, Charles II issued a new charter to a group of eight English noblemen, granting them the land of Carolina, as a reward for their faithful support of his efforts to regain the throne of England. The eight were called Lords Proprietor or simply Proprietors. The 1663 charter granted the Lords Proprietor title to all of the land from the southern border of the Virginia Colony at 36 degrees north to 31 degrees north (along the coast of present-day Georgia). The establishment of separate colonies did not officially occur until 1729, when seven of the Lords Proprietors sold their interests in Carolina to the Crown, and both North Carolina and South Carolina became royal colonies.

In 1665, the charter was revised slightly, with the northerly boundary extended to 36 degrees 30 minutes north to include the lands of the Albemarle Settlements along the Albemarle Sound, which had been settled mainly by Virginians migrating south. Likewise, the southern boundary was moved south to 29 degrees north, just south of present-day Daytona Beach, Florida, which had the effect of including the existing Spanish settlement at St. Augustine, an unenforceable overreach of English power. The charter also granted all the land, between these northerly and southerly bounds, from the Atlantic Ocean, westward to the shores of the Pacific Ocean, an even more unenforceable overreach.

Between 1663 and 1729 there were many disagreements relating to defense, governance and the difference between the two differing agrarian styles employed by the inhabitants of the Colony of Virginia and that practiced by the planters arriving to Charles Town from the West Indies and Barbados.

In 1729 the Province of Carolina was divided when the descendants of seven of the eight Lords Proprietors sold their shares back to the Crown. Only the heirs of Sir George Carteret retained their original rights to what would become the Granville District. Both the Province of North Carolina and the Province of South Carolina became British Crown Colonies in 1729.

During the American Civil War (1861–1865), South Carolina was the first Southern state to secede from the Union, while North Carolina was the second to last state to secede. South Carolina was generally one of the strongest supporters of the Confederacy. The war began in Charleston, South Carolina, where cadets of the South Carolina Military Academy, known as The Citadel, fired the opening shots at the Union Ship Star of the West. North Carolina was also a key Confederate state, raising and supplying many regiments of soldiers to the Confederacy. At Gettysburg, one in four Confederate soldiers was from North Carolina, despite the fact that some North Carolinians (especially in the western part of the state) refused to support the Confederacy. North Carolina's Civil War governor, Zebulon Vance, was an outspoken critic of Confederate President Jefferson Davis and frequently refused to obey Davis's orders for reinforcements and supplies; Vance insisted the soldiers and supplies would be needed for North Carolina's Confederate effort. However, during the seven days' battles, North Carolina did send large numbers of troops for the general aid of the South as a whole. The Carolinas were both instrumental in keeping the Confederacy alive, because of their deepwater ports in Wilmington and Charleston. These two cities were key in supplying Southern armies with weapons, clothing, and ammunition, and producing food and provisions for Southern civilians. 

A Unionist presence would persist throughout North Carolina during the Civil War, with North Carolina forming its own Union Army regiments. In South Carolina, there was no Union Army regiments formed due to a smaller unionist presence, although the Upstate region of the state was a haven for Confederate Army deserters and resisters, as they used the Upstate topography and traditional community relations to resist service in the Confederate ranks.

Culture
The culture of the Carolinas is a distinct subset of larger Southern culture. Notably, the coastal Carolinas region was settled by Europeans over a century before the inland regions of the South. There was a particular early influence of Caribbean culture, especially from the English colony of Barbados; in which many of the early governors during the unified period were from. 

Though the two states both make up part of the Southern United States, there are historically a number of differences in the settlement patterns, political development, and economic growth between North and South Carolina.

Politics
During most of the 20th century, South Carolina was a bastion of the "solid Democratic South" with almost no Republican officeholders, and the state frequently elected politicians who were outspoken supporters of racial segregation. North Carolina, while mostly Democratic, contained a large Republican minority – the state voted Republican in the presidential election of 1928 and elected several Republican congressmen, governors, and senators from 1868 to 1928 – and North Carolina was widely known as one of the more progressive Southern states on the issue of segregation and civil rights. In 1947, the journalist John Gunther wrote, "that North Carolina is by a good deal the most progressive Southern state will, I imagine, be agreed to by almost everybody." On the other hand, he described South Carolina as "one of the poorest American states, and probably one of the balkiest." In describing the differences between the two states, Gunther noted that, in 1947, divorce in North Carolina "may be granted simply on the ground of absence of cohabitation; South Carolina is the one American state in which divorce is not possible." 

Despite North Carolina being a swing state since the early 21st century in presidential elections, and South Carolina being one that reliably votes for Republican presidential candidates, they are technically the country's two most politically similar states, according to a comparison of the states along a range of 19 variables performed by the statistician Nate Silver in 2008.

Economy
Historically, like much of the South, the Carolinas economy was one based around agriculture production. The predominance of certain crops would help influence the regional economy:
Like other [Southern] states, until after World War II North Carolina remained primarily a region of small farms and factories heavily dependent on just a few labor-intensive crops, relying on sharecropping and tenancy, especially for black laborers. The Carolinas are distinct for their economic dependence on tobacco as well as on cotton and rice, and for their many small-scale furniture, textile, and tobacco factories.

These industries gave the Carolinas, particularly North Carolina, a more significant industrial base than most Southern states. As mechanization increased in farming, along with textiles, apparel, and furniture jobs shifting because of globalization, combined with the decline of the tobacco industry, many rural and small urban communities suffered. During the late 20th century, both states began to experience growth in the technological and banking sectors, bringing jobs, population growth, and new economic industries. These changes, as with earlier industrialization, were more pronounced in North Carolina, with South Carolina experiencing a slower rate of economic growth for several years.

Since the 1980s, North Carolina has emerged as a financial hub with Charlotte becoming the second-largest financial district in the United States after New York City. Charlotte is home to the several major publicly traded corporations headquarters such as Bank of America, Truist Financial, and the East Coast operations of Wells Fargo, and Centene Corporation, as well as six other Fortune 500 companies, including Lowe's, Duke Energy, Nucor, Honeywell, Brighthouse Financial, and Sonic Automotive.

Boundary between the states

Plotting the boundary
According to the Prefatory Notes to Volume 5 of the Colonial Records of North Carolina, the process of determining the boundary between North and South Carolina began in 1720 "when the purpose to erect a
third Province in Carolina, with Savannah for its northern boundary" began. On 8 January 1730 an agreement between the two colonies said for the border "to begin 30 miles southwest of the Cape Fear River, and to be run at that parallel distance the whole course of said river;" The next June Governor Robert Johnson of South Carolina said the border should start 30 miles southwest of the source of the Cape Fear "due west as far as the South Sea", unless the "Waccamaw River lyes [sic] within 30 miles of the Cape Fear river," which would make the Waccamaw the boundary. North Carolina agreed to this until the discovery that the Cape Fear headwaters were very close to Virginia, which would not have "permitted any extension on the part of North Carolina to the westward." In 1732, Governor George Burrington of North Carolina stated in Timothy's Southern Gazette that territory north of the Waccamaw was in North Carolina, to which Johnson replied that South Carolina claimed the land. Johnson said this was "only a mistake in wording it."

Both Carolinas selected commissioners to survey the line between them. The plan called for the line to run northwest to 35 degrees latitude, unless the Pee Dee River was reached first, in which case it would run along the Pee Dee to 35 degrees north. Then the line would run west to Catawba town, though if the town were north of the line, the line was to run around Catawba to keep it in South Carolina.

In May 1735, the surveyors went from the Cape Fear westward 30 miles along the coast. Then they turned northwest and marked the location with stakes. The surveyors agreed to meet again on September 18. However, only the North Carolina team returned at that time, extending the line northwest . The South Carolina team arrived in October and followed the previous line for only  because they had not been paid. A deputy surveyor marked where the Pee Dee crossed the 35th parallel. An extension of the line in 1737 ran  to a stake in a meadow. However, the stake placed at the endpoint of the survey was  too far south.

In 1764, a second extension ran  westward. In 1772, after making adjustments to keep the Catawba Indians in South Carolina, "extended in a due west course from the confluence of the north and south forks of the Catawba River to Tryon Mountain." However, this extension was based on the erroneous position of the 1737 stake, removing  from South Carolina. Joseph Caldwell, president of the University of North Carolina at Chapel Hill, found that the line west of the Pee Dee did not run along the 35th parallel, but 12 miles to the south. However, the western part of the line ran far enough to the north to make up for the difference. West of this point the border was shifted to run north of the 35th parallel so that the total areas of the states would return to what was intended, although the accuracy of this part of the survey was marred by a magnetic anomaly in the Charlotte, North Carolina area.

North Carolina did not agree to the line of 1772 until 1813. A 1905 survey determined the border between Scotland County, North Carolina and Marlboro County, South Carolina. A 1928 survey decided the border between Horry County, South Carolina and Brunswick and Columbus counties in North Carolina.

Recent history
In the mid-1990s, Duke Energy determined that the border between the Carolinas needed to be re-surveyed, as the company was selling and donating land in the Jocassee Gorge area, which included parts of both states. Also, with more people living outside cities, the precise boundaries of fire, tax, and school district lines needed to be known. This was especially a problem in the mountains, where people had previously lived in valleys, not on the ridges where the border was. A 15-year plan to re-establish the boundary began, using maps from the 1813–1815 survey and GPS technology. A few stone markers still read, "NC/SC 1815 AD" but other locations were marked with trees which no longer stand.

South Carolina had recently been involved in a costly legal battle with Georgia over a small number of islands in the Savannah River, and wanted to avoid the expense of a lawsuit regarding the North Carolina border, so the two states agreed in 1993 to cooperate in resurveying the border. The effort included using colonial-era maps to reconstruct the positions of trees marking the border that had long since died, and tracking down the original positions of stone markers that had been moved.

After 18 years and $980,000, it was predicted that the process of determining the border between the Carolinas would be complete in 2012. Financial problems delayed the last survey until October 2012, meaning the results were not expected to be known until Spring 2013. It was found that a gas station and 30 homes could change states. Lake Wylie Mini Market has been located in South Carolina, along U.S. Route 321, and the move to North Carolina would result in higher gas taxes and change laws on beer and fireworks. The state legislatures involved expect to pass laws alleviating the concerns those changing states would face.

The Joint Boundary Commission met in February 2014 in Monroe, North Carolina to determine what actions still needed to be taken. The persons living in 50 homes that changed states would have to get driver's licenses and register to vote in their new states. Legislative action could allow people to keep utilities, avoid back taxes to the new state, and continue in the same schools. Lake Wylie Minimarket could be grandfathered, or Congress could change the defined border at the store's location, though the commission intended to avoid such an action. As of August 2014, the states were expected to pass legislation to mitigate many of the negative impacts to affected landowners.

On June 1, 2016, the South Carolina House of Representatives passed a bill setting the border. North Carolina's Senate also passed a bill, which also had to clear the House. North Carolina Governor Pat McCrory signed his state's bill in June. Three families who actually lived in North Carolina had South Carolina addresses, and 16 South Carolina residents had believed they lived in North Carolina. On December 9, 2016, McCrory announced that he signed a four-page executive order formally defining the border between the two states based on the 20 years of work.

Major population centers

Combined Statistical Areas

Metropolitan Statistical Areas

Urban areas

Counties

Cities

Professional sports 

The Carolinas have three professional sports teams in the Big Four major leagues: the Carolina Panthers of the NFL, the Charlotte Hornets of the NBA, and the Carolina Hurricanes of the NHL. Supported by both states, the three teams are all based in NC, with two in Charlotte and the third in Raleigh.

Professional sports franchises in the Carolinas first formed during the late 20th century. The oldest team pro team in the Carolinas, the NBA's Charlotte Hornets, were established in 1988, while the youngest, Major League Soccer's Charlotte FC , were established in 2019. The Hornets were known as the Bobcats from 2004 to 2014, and were renamed the Hornets again in May 2014, one season after the former New Orleans Hornets decided to rebrand themselves as the Pelicans. At that time, the Hornets also regained sole ownership of the pre-relocation history of the original Charlotte Hornets. The Hurricanes formed in 1971 as the New England Whalers of the World Hockey Association. After the NHL-WHA merger in 1979, they joined the NHL as the Hartford Whalers until 1997 when they relocated to Raleigh, North Carolina. Currently, the Hurricanes are the most successful after their 2006 Stanley Cup championship marked the first professional sports title for the region. In 2019, a Major League Soccer team was awarded to Charlotte, and begin play in 2022.

Bank of America Stadium currently hosts three major sporting events, the Duke's Mayo Bowl, the Belk Kickoff Game and the ACC Championship Game. 

Charlotte Motor Speedway hosts three major NASCAR events, the Coca-Cola 600, the Monster Energy NASCAR All-Star Race, and the Bank of America 500.

See also 
Appalachian English
Cuisine of the Southern United States
Great Wagon Road
Politics of the Southern United States
Southern American English
The Californias
The Canadas
The Dakotas
The Floridas
The Virginias

Further reading
 John Gunther. Inside USA, Harper & Brothers, 1947.

References

External links
 

Divided regions
Border irregularities of the United States
History of the Thirteen Colonies
Geography of North Carolina
Geography of South Carolina
Regions of the Southern United States
1663 establishments in the Thirteen Colonies